is a former Japanese football player and manager.

Playing career
Takahiro Taguchi played for Yomiuri as defender from 1980 to 1983.

Coaching career
Since 1985, Takahiro Taguchi has been a  coach for youth teams; e.g. Rissho University, Verdy Kawasaki youth team, Teikyo University. In 2011, he became the coach for Yokohama FC. In, March 2012, manager; Yasuyuki Kishino was sacked. Takahiro Taguchi managed team as caretaker. In 2014, he became coach for FC Gifu, and in July 2016, he resigned.

References

External links
soccerway.com

1957 births
Living people
Osaka University of Commerce alumni
Association football people from Tokyo
Japanese footballers
Japan Soccer League players
Tokyo Verdy players
Japanese football managers
Yokohama FC managers
Association football defenders